Friends in trouble (Spanish: Amigos en apuros) is a 2018 Peruvian comedy film written and directed by Joel Calero & Lucho Cáceres (in his directorial debut). It stars Lucho Cáceres and Christian Thorsen. It premiered on October 18, 2018 in Peruvian theaters.

Synopsis 
Fico is devastated by his recent divorce and Manolo, his lifelong friend, decides to move in with him. What Fico doesn't know is that Manolo is fleeing from some gangsters who are chasing him. Before they know it, they will already be involved in a series of crazy entanglements that will finally lead them to discover the true meaning of friendship.

Cast 
The actors participating in this film are:

 Lucho Cáceres as Manolo
 Christian Thorsen as Fico
 Gustavo Bueno
 Reynaldo Arenas
 Cécica Bernasconi
 Luciana Blomberg
 Aldo Miyashiro
 Milett Figueroa
 Pold Gastelo
 Magdyel Ugaz

Production 
Principal photography for the film began on January 5, 2018 under the title Solteros Inmaduros (Immature Singles), but was later changed to Amigos en apuros (Friends in trouble) to make it more commercial.

Reception 
Friends in trouble attracted 137,768 viewers, becoming the 11th highest-grossing Peruvian film of 2018.

References

External links 

 

2018 films
2018 comedy films
Peruvian comedy films
Peruvian buddy comedy films
2010s Spanish-language films
2010s Peruvian films
Films set in Peru
Films shot in Peru
Films about friendship
Films about divorce
2018 directorial debut films